Kim Yeong-il may refer to:
 Kim Yeong-il (basketball)
 Kim Yeong-il (wrestler)